Embryo is a 3D first-person shoot 'em up video game released in 1994 for the Amiga. It was developed by Croatian developer Beyond Arts and published by Black Legend. The player assumes the role of a pilot who manns an advanced fighter in order to drive the aliens invading the Earth away. The game bears semblance to flight simulation games, but is described as pure mayhem without any emphasis on realism.

Gameplay
The aircraft can be steered with either the mouse, joystick or keyboard, whereas the player also uses buttons on the keyboard or mouse to manage weapons and flight controls. Weapons include cannons, guided and unguided missiles, energy balls and machine guns placed either frontally or sideways. The HUD displays a map, radar, speed and status reports. The game is also notable for allowing two-player co-op.

Reception

The game received generally positive reviews upon release. The sound effects and music were lauded. Reviewers particularly praised its very smooth and fast gameplay, at the expense of the relatively simpler graphics. However, the high difficulty, specifically the toughness of the enemies, has been criticized.

References

External links
Embryo at Lemon Amiga 
Embryo at Amiga Hall of Light

1994 video games
Amiga games
Amiga 1200 games
Combat flight simulators
Video games developed in Croatia